Edward Scott Ashenden (born 5 October 1939) was an Australian politician who represented the South Australian House of Assembly seats of Todd from 1979 to 1985 and Wright from 1993 to 1997 for the Liberal Party.

References

 

Members of the South Australian House of Assembly
1939 births
Living people
Liberal Party of Australia members of the Parliament of South Australia